The 2019 MSBL season was the 31st season of the Men's State Basketball League (SBL). The regular season began on Friday 15 March, with round 1 seeing a 2018 grand final rematch between the Perry Lakes Hawks and Joondalup Wolves. The 2019 MSBL All-Star Game was played on 3 June at Bendat Basketball Centre – the home of basketball in Western Australia. The regular season ended on Sunday 28 July. The finals began on Saturday 3 August and ended on Saturday 31 August, when the Geraldton Buccaneers defeated the Wolves in the MSBL Grand Final.

Regular season
The regular season began on Friday 15 March and ended on Sunday 28 July after 20 rounds of competition. Easter games in round 6 were again scheduled for a blockbuster Thursday night, with all teams then on a break over the long weekend. Games tipped-off again on Anzac Day as the tradition continued between the Kalamunda Eastern Suns and Willetton Tigers. There was also Women's Round in round 9 and Heritage Round in round 16, while the new concept of Mental Health Awareness Round was included for round 19.

Changes for the 2019 season saw the Stirling Senators rebrand as the Warwick Senators, while the East Perth Eagles relocated from Morley Sport & Recreation Centre to Herb Graham Recreation Centre.

Standings

Finals
The finals began on Saturday 3 August and ended on Saturday 31 August with the MSBL Grand Final.

Bracket

All-Star Game
The 2019 MSBL All-Star Game took place at Bendat Basketball Centre on Monday 3 June, with all proceeds going to Red Frogs Australia.

Rosters

Game data

Awards

Player of the Week

Statistics leaders

Regular season
 Most Valuable Player: Joshua Braun (Kalamunda Eastern Suns)
 Coach of the Year: Dave Daniels (Lakeside Lightning)
 Most Improved Player: Luke Travers (Rockingham Flames)
 All-MSBL First Team:
 PG: Marshall Nelson (Perth Redbacks)
 SG: Joshua Braun (Kalamunda Eastern Suns)
 SF: Gavin Field (Cockburn Cougars)
 PF: Greg Hire (Rockingham Flames)
 C: Patrick Burke (Goldfields Giants)
 All-Defensive Team:
 PG: Cameron Williams (East Perth Eagles)
 SG: David Humphries (Goldfields Giants)
 SF: Ben Purser (Perry Lakes Hawks)
 PF: Maurice Barrow (Willetton Tigers)
 C: Jarrad Prue (Lakeside Lightning)

Finals
 Grand Final MVP: Liam Hunt (Geraldton Buccaneers)

References

External links
 2019 fixtures
 2019 season preview
 2019 Flames season prview
 All-Star starters
 2019 grand final preview

2019
2018–19 in Australian basketball
2019–20 in Australian basketball